Nickel oxide may refer to:

 Nickel(II) oxide, NiO, green, well-characterised oxide
 Nickel(III) oxide, Ni2O3, black, not well-characterised oxide
 Oxonickelates